Walter Huppenkothen  (31 December 1907 in Haan, Rhineland – 5 April 1978 in Lübeck) was a German lawyer, Sicherheitsdienst (SD) leader, and Schutzstaffel (SS) prosecutor in the Hauptamt SS-Gericht.

Huppenkothen attended school in Opladen and studied Law and Political Science at the University of Cologne and University of Düsseldorf and then qualified as a lawyer. On 1 May 1933, he joined the Nazi Party and the Allgemeine SS. Unable to find employment in government service he joined the SD (the intelligence service of the SS) in Düsseldorf. He also served for a brief time as head of State Police and as an SD Chief in the East Prussian-town of Tilsit (now Sovetsk, Russia), and was replaced in both positions by fellow Gestapo member Dr. Heinz Gräfe in October and November of 1937.

World War II

Role in the Holocaust 

Following the German invasion of Poland, Huppenkothen was involved in the Holocaust in various areas of occupied Poland (part of the Nazi-controlled General Government). He worked as a liaison with the SD's Einsatzgruppen during his time as part of the Gestapo, as well as an SD Chief in Kraków and as head of the Gestapo in Lublin in February 1940 . In July 1941, he was appointed to the Reich Security Main Office (RSHA) in Berlin with the rank of Sturmbannführer (Major) in charge of a Gestapo unit dealing with political enemies of the Reich as the successor to Walter Schellenberg.

Prosecutions 

As an SS Standartenführer (Colonel) he was appointed the prosecutor of the SS and police court in Munich. On 6 April 1945, he prosecuted Hans von Dohnanyi in Sachsenhausen concentration camp while the defendant lay semi-conscious on a stretcher having contracted a serious infection and the proceedings ended with him being condemned to death by Sturmbannführer Otto Thorbeck.  On 8 April 1945, under orders from Ernst Kaltenbrunner, he was the prosecutor at a drumhead court-martial presided over by Otto Thorbeck without witnesses, records of proceedings or a defence in Flossenbürg concentration camp. Among the condemned were Lutheran clergyman Dietrich Bonhoeffer, General Hans Oster, Army Chief Judge Dr. Karl Sack, Captain Ludwig Gehre and former head of the Abwehr Admiral Wilhelm Canaris. The prisoners were accused of making an assassination attempt by bombing on Adolf Hitler at his headquarters of Wolf's Lair, which killed four and wounded Hitler himself.  The court's prosecution employed torture methods such as thumb screwing and mechanical stretching devices on the accused, who were subsequently sentenced to death after a brief trial and executed by hanging on 9 April 1945, only around two weeks before the camp's liberation. Otto Thorbeck later testified that the conspiracy trials lasted three hours under Huppenkothen's direction and that he shouted the accusation at them, then permitted a brief answer period before the death sentence was imposed. A commemorative plaque for the prisoners executed, as well as a statue of Bonhoeffer, exists at the former site of the camp, now a memorial site.

Post-war

Collaboration with US military 

Huppenkothen was captured at Gmunden on 26 April 1945. After the war, Huppenkothen was interned by the Americans and worked for the Counterintelligence Corps of the US Army until 1949. The Army's counterintelligence division took a particular interest in Huppenkothen's knowledge of Communism and his work as a Gestapo official in searching for members of the Communist resistance and espionage group, the Red Orchestra.

Trials and testimonies 

From 1949–1956, Walter Huppenkothen was tried multiple times for torture and murder in his 8 April 1945 prosecution. For the charge(s) of murder, Huppenkothen was acquitted, but he was still sentenced to prison-time on charges of torture (sources conflict on the exact length of the sentence, but it is believed to have ranged somewhere between 3.5–7 years), although the acquittal of his murder charge(s) has continued to arouse criticism in modern times.

Huppenkothen also testified at the May 1961 trial of Adolf Eichmann in Jerusalem, Israel, though his family reported that he was reluctant to do so.

References

1907 births
1978 deaths
SS-Standartenführer
Jurists from North Rhine-Westphalia
Gestapo personnel
Einsatzgruppen personnel
Lawyers in the Nazi Party
Reich Security Main Office personnel